Diego de Enzinas (c. 1520 – c. 15 March 1547), or Jacobus Dryander, Protestant scholar of Spanish origin, active in the Low Countries and Rome, executed by the Roman Inquisition.

Diego de Enzinas was the brother of the better-known Francisco de Enzinas. He was born into a successful merchant family in Burgos, Spain, a little before 1520. After going to the Low Countries for commercial training, he enrolled at the Collegium Trilingue of Louvain on 28 October 1538. He also studied in Paris. In March 1542 he was in Antwerp supervising the printing of a little book titled Breve y compendiosa institución de la religión cristiana. It was a translation made by his brother Francisco of John Calvin's 1538 Latin Catechism, to which was appended a translation of Martin Luther's Freedom of the Christian Man. It also contains an original prologue that may be the work of Diego (rather than Francisco) expressing a Protestant idea of justification by faith in language that would be familiar to Spanish alumbrados and Catholic humanists. Marcel Bataillon calls it 'an exceptional piece of Protestant spiritual writing' (‘un trozo excepcional de literatura espiritual protestante'). Diego planned to smuggle  copies of the book into Spain, but the Spanish Inquisition got wind of the plan. As a result, his family persuaded him to seek the relative safety of Rome, where he became part of an evangelical circle. However, the Roman Inquisition was reinstated there in 1542, and Diego fell foul of it after a letter he had written to Luther was intercepted. Under torture, Diego named the members of his religious circle. He was tried, and burned at the stake on or about 15 March 1547.

References
Bataillon, Marcel, 'Diego de Enzinas en Amberes: ortografía castellana de un libro prohibido', in idem, Érasme et Espagne, 3rd French ed. (Geneva 1991), vol. 3, pp. 249–75.
Bataillon, Marcel, 'El hispanismo y los problemas de la historia de la espiritualidad española (a propósito de un libro protestante español olvidado)', in idem, Érasme et Espagne, 3rd French ed. (Geneva 1991), vol. 3.
Caponetto, Salvatore, The Protestant Reformation in Sixteenth Century Italy, Anne C. Tedeschi and John Tedeschi (trans.) (Kirksville, MO, 1999), pp. 196–9, 236-7.
Enzinas, Francisco de, Epistolario, Ignacio J. García Pinilla (ed.) (Geneva 1995), p 83. A letter from Francisco de Enzinas to Juan Díaz regarding the Breve y compendiosa institución.
Herminjard, A.-L., 9 vols (Nieuwkoop 1965), vol. 9, no. 944a. A letter of Diego de Enzinas (Jacobus Dryander) to Joris Cassander regarding the Breve y compendiosa institución.
Luther, Martin, Werke: kritische Gesamtausgabe: Briefwechsel, vol. 11 (Graz 1966), no. 4180. Letter of Diego de Enzinas to Martin Luther.

1520s births
1547 deaths
Protestant Reformers
People executed by Spain by burning
Executed writers
Spanish male writers
Executed Spanish people